BRICS is an acronym for five leading emerging economies: Brazil, Russia, India, China, and South Africa. The first four were initially grouped as "BRIC" (or "the BRICs") in 2001 by Goldman Sachs economist Jim O'Neill, who coined the term to describe fast-growing economies that would collectively dominate the global economy by 2050; South Africa was added in 2010.

Brazil, Russia, India, and China are among the world's ten largest countries by population, area, and GDP, and the latter three are widely considered to be current or emerging superpowers. All five states are members of the G20, with a combined nominal GDP of US$26.6 trillion (about 26.2% of the gross world product), a total GDP (PPP) of around US$51.99 trillion (32.1% of global GDP PPP), and an estimated US$4.46 trillion in combined foreign reserves (as of 2018).

The BRICS were originally identified for the purpose of highlighting investment opportunities and had not been a formal intergovernmental organization. Since 2009, they have increasingly formed into a more cohesive geopolitical bloc, with their governments meeting annually at formal summits and coordinating multilateral policies; China hosted the most recent 14th BRICS summit on 24 July 2022. Bilateral relations among the BRICS are conducted mainly on the basis of non-interference, equality, and mutual benefit.

The BRICS are considered the foremost rival to the G7 bloc of leading advanced economies, announcing competing initiatives such as the New Development Bank, Contingent Reserve Arrangement, BRICS payment system, and BRICS basket reserve currency. Since 2022, the group has sought to expand membership, with several developing countries expressing interest in joining. The BRICS have received both praise and criticism from numerous commentators.

History

The BRICS
The term BRIC was originally developed in the context of foreign investment strategies. It was introduced in the 2001 publication, Building Better Global Economic BRICs by then-chairman of Goldman Sachs Asset Management, Jim O'Neill; the term was coined by Roopa Purushothaman, who was a Research Assistant in the original report.

For investing purposes, the list of emerging economies sometimes included South Korea, which expanded the acronym to BRICS or BRICK.

The foreign ministers of the initial four BRIC General states (Brazil, Russia, India, and China) met in New York City in September 2006 at the margins of the General Debate of the UN Assembly, beginning a series of high-level meetings. A full-scale diplomatic meeting was held in Yekaterinburg, Russia, on 16 June 2009.

The BRIC grouping's 1st formal summit, also held in Yekaterinburg, commenced on 16 June 2009, with Luiz Inácio Lula da Silva, Dmitry Medvedev, Manmohan Singh, and Hu Jintao, the respective leaders of Brazil, Russia, India, and China, all attending. The summit's focus was on improving the global economic situation and reforming financial institutions, and discussed how the four countries could better co-operate in the future. There was further discussion of ways that developing countries, such as 3/4 of the BRIC members, could become more involved in global affairs.

In the aftermath of the Yekaterinburg summit, the BRIC nations announced the need for a new global reserve currency, which would have to be "diverse, stable and predictable." Although the statement that was released did not directly criticize the perceived "dominance" of the US dollar – something that Russia had criticized in the past – it did spark a fall in the value of the dollar against other major currencies.

Entry of South Africa
In 2010, South Africa began efforts to join the BRIC grouping, and the process for its formal admission began in August of that year. South Africa officially became a member nation on 24 December 2010, after being formally invited by China to join and subsequently accepted by other BRIC countries. The group was renamed BRICS – with the "S" standing for South Africa – to reflect the group's expanded membership. In April 2011, the President of South Africa, Jacob Zuma, attended the 2011 BRICS summit in Sanya, China, as a full member.

Potential further expansion 
Since South Africa joined the BRIC grouping (now BRICS) in 2010, numerous other countries have expressed interest in joining the bloc, including Argentina and Iran. Both signaled their intent to join BRICS during meetings with senior Chinese officials, the current BRICS chair, over the course of the summer of 2022. Beijing backed Argentina's potential accession following a meeting between Argentine Foreign Minister Santiago Cafiero and Chinese State Councilor and Foreign Minister Wang Yi on the margins of the G20 Summit in Indonesia. China once again reiterated their support for Argentina’s potential application during a subsequent meeting between Cafiero and Yi on the margins of the 77th UN General Assembly. Likewise, it is understood that both Russia, India, and Brazil support Argentina’s application. Iran also submitted an application in June 2022 to Chinese authorities to join the economic association of emerging markets. Relations between Iran, China and Russia have warmed in recent months as all three governments seek new allies against increasing Western opposition. There is no formal application process as such to join BRICS, but any hopeful government must receive unanimous backing from all existing BRICS members—Brazil, Russia, India, China, and South Africa—to receive an invitation.

Developments

The BRICS Forum, an independent international organization encouraging commercial, political, and cultural cooperation among the BRICS nations, was formed in 2011. In June 2012, the BRICS nations pledged $75 billion to boost the lending power of the International Monetary Fund (IMF). However, this loan was conditional on IMF voting reforms. In late March 2013, during the fifth BRICS summit in Durban, South Africa, the member countries agreed to create a global financial institution intended to cooperate with the western-dominated IMF and World Bank. After the summit, the BRICS stated that they planned to finalize the arrangements for this New Development Bank by 2014. However, disputes relating to burden sharing and location slowed down the agreements.

At the BRICS leaders meeting in St Petersburg in September 2013, China committed $41 billion towards the pool; Brazil, India, and Russia $18 billion each; and South Africa $5 billion. China, holder of the world's largest foreign exchange reserves and contributes the bulk of the currency pool, wants a more significant managing role, said one BRICS official. China also wants to be the location of the reserve. "Brazil and India want the initial capital to be shared equally. We know that China wants more," said a Brazilian official. "However, we are still negotiating, there are no tensions arising yet." On 11 October 2013, Russia's Finance Minister Anton Siluanov said that creating a $100 billion in funds designated to steady currency markets would be taken in early 2014. The Brazilian finance minister, Guido Mantega, stated that the fund would be created by March 2014. However, by April 2014, the currency reserve pool and development bank had yet to be set up, and the date was rescheduled to 2015. One driver for the BRICS development bank is that the existing institutions primarily benefit extra-BRICS corporations, and the political significance is notable because it allows BRICS member states "to promote their interests abroad... and can highlight the strengthening positions of countries whose opinion is frequently ignored by their developed American and European colleagues."

In March 2014, at a meeting on the margins of the Nuclear Security Summit in The Hague, the BRICS Foreign Ministers issued a communique that "noted with concern, the recent media statement on the forthcoming G20 Summit to be held in Brisbane in November 2014. The custodianship of the G20 belongs to all Member States equally, and no one Member State can unilaterally determine its nature and character." In light of the tensions surrounding the annexation of Ukrainian Crimea by Russia, the Ministers remarked that "The escalation of hostile language, sanctions and counter-sanctions, and force does not contribute to a sustainable and peaceful solution, according to international law, including the principles and purposes of the United Nations Charter." This was in response to the statement of the then Australian Foreign Minister Julie Bishop, who had said earlier that Russian President Vladimir Putin might be barred from attending the G20 Summit in Brisbane.

In July 2014, the Governor of the Russian Central Bank, Elvira Nabiullina, claimed that the "BRICS partners promote the establishment of a system of multilateral swaps that will allow them to transfer resources to one or another country if needed" in an article which concluded that "If the current trend continues, soon the dollar will be abandoned by most of the significant global economies and it will be kicked out of the global trade finance."

Over the weekend of 13 July 2014, when the final game of the FIFA World Cup was held, and in advance of the BRICS Fortaleza summit, Putin met fellow leader Dilma Rousseff to discuss the BRICS development bank, and sign some other bilateral accords on air defense, gas and education. Rousseff said that the BRICS countries "are among the largest in the world and cannot content themselves in the middle of the 21st century with any kind of dependency." The Fortaleza summit was followed by a BRICS meeting with the Union of South American Nations presidents in Brasilia, where the development bank and the monetary fund were introduced. The development bank will have capital of US$50 billion with each country contributing US$10 billion, while the monetary fund will have US$100 billion at its disposal.

On 15 July, the first day of the BRICS sixth summit in Fortaleza, Brazil, the group of emerging economies signed the long-anticipated document to create the US$100 billion New Development Bank (formerly known as the "BRICS Development Bank") and a reserve currency pool worth over another US$100 billion. Documents on cooperation between BRICS export credit agencies and an agreement of cooperation on innovation were also inked.

At the end of October 2014, Brazil trimmed down its holdings of US government securities to US$261.7 billion; India, US$77.5 billion; China, US$1.25 trillion; South Africa, US$10.3 billion.

In March 2015, Morgan Stanley stated that India and Indonesia had escaped from the 'fragile five' (the five major emerging markets with the most fragile currencies) by instituting economic reforms. Previously, in August 2013, Morgan Stanley rated India and Indonesia, together with Brazil, Turkey, and South Africa, as the 'fragile five' due to their vulnerable currencies. But since then, India and Indonesia have reformed their economies, completing 85% and 65% of the necessary adjustments respectively, while Brazil had only achieved 15%, Turkey only 10%, and South Africa even less.

After the 2015 summit, the respective communications ministers, under a Russian proposal, had a first summit for their ministries in Moscow in October where the host minister, Nikolai Nikiforov, proposed an initiative to further tighten their information technology sectors and challenge the monopoly of the United States in the sector.

Since 2012, the BRICS group of countries have been planning an optical fibre submarine communications cable system to carry telecommunications between the BRICS countries, known as the BRICS Cable. Part of the motivation for the project was the spying of the U.S. National Security Agency on all telecommunications that flowed in and out of United States territory.

In August 2019, the communications ministers of the BRICS countries signed a letter of intent to cooperate in the Information and Communication Technology sector. This agreement was signed in the fifth edition of meeting of communication ministers of countries member of the group held in Brasília, Brazil.

The New Development Bank, located in China, plans on giving out $15 billion to member nation to help their struggling economies. Member countries are hoping for a smooth comeback and a continuation of economic trade pre-COVID-19. The summit they plan on doing virtually in St. Petersburg, Russia will discuss how to handle the COVID-19 pandemic and how to fix their multilateral system by reforms. The COVID-19 accepting rate of taking the vaccine is a mixture in the BRICS community. China, India, and South Africa are the most willing to take the vaccine while Brazil and Russia have more skepticism than the other three. During the 13th BRICS summit, Indian Prime Minister Narendra Modi called for a transparent investigation into the origins of COVID-19 under the World Health Organization with the full cooperation of "all countries", and Chinese leader Xi Jinping spoke directly afterwards, calling on BRICS countries to "oppose politicisation" of the process.

Summits
The grouping has held annual summits since 2009, with member countries taking turns to host. Prior to South Africa's admission, two BRIC summits were held, in 2009 and 2010. The first five-member BRICS summit was held in 2011. The most recent BRICS leaders' summit took place virtually on 23 June 2022 hosted by China. India has hosted the BRICS 2021 summit at New Delhi & amid tensions with China, Chinese leader Xi Jinping had made a soft move by supporting India's Chairmanship in 2021.

Member countries

Bangladesh, Egypt, the United Arab Emirates and Uruguay are members of BRICS New Development Bank.

Membership expansion proposals
Discussions about the expansion and entry of new member countries were little addressed until the early 2020s, after this date, leaders and top ranking diplomats of the founding nations began discussions for the expansion of the group.  Algeria, Argentina, Bahrain, Bangladesh, Belarus, Egypt, Indonesia, Iran, Mexico, Nigeria, Pakistan, Saudi Arabia, Sudan, Syria, Turkey, the UAE, Venezuela and Zimbabwe have expressed interest in membership of BRICS.

On 16 March 2023, Russia announced that it supported Algeria's bid to join BRICS.

Applicant nations
  applied in 2022
  applied in 2022
  applied in 2022

Nations interested in membership

BRICS Expansion Dialogue participant nations

Financial architecture

Currently, there are two components that make up the financial architecture of BRICS, namely, the New Development Bank (NDB), or sometimes referred to as the BRICS Development Bank, and the Contingent Reserve Arrangement (CRA). Both of these components were signed into treaty in 2014 and became active in 2015.

New Development Bank

The New Development Bank (NDB), formally referred to as the BRICS Development Bank, is a multilateral development bank operated by the five BRICS states. The bank's primary focus of lending will be infrastructure projects with authorized lending of up to $34 billion annually. South Africa will be the African Headquarters of the Bank named the "New Development Bank Africa Regional Centre." The bank will have starting capital of $50 billion, with wealth increased to $100 billion over time. Brazil, Russia, India, China, and South Africa will initially contribute $10 billion each to bring the total to $50 billion. It has so far 53 projects under way worth around $15 billion.

Recently Bangladesh, Egypt, the United Arab Emirates and Uruguay were added as new members of BRICS New Development Bank (NDB).

BRICS CRA

The BRICS Contingent Reserve Arrangement (CRA) is a framework for providing protection against global liquidity pressures. This includes currency issues where members' national currencies are being adversely affected by global financial pressures. It is found that emerging economies that experienced rapid economic liberalization went through increased economic volatility, bringing an uncertain macroeconomic environment. The CRA is generally seen as a competitor to the International Monetary Fund (IMF) and along with the New Development Bank is viewed as an example of increasing South-South cooperation. It was established in 2015 by the BRICS countries. The legal basis is formed by the Treaty for the Establishment of a BRICS Contingent Reserve Arrangement, signed at Fortaleza, Brazil on 15 July 2014. With its inaugural meetings of the BRICS CRA Governing Council and Standing Committee, held on 4 September 2015, in Ankara, Turkey it entered into force upon ratification by all BRICS states, announced at the 7th BRICS summit in July 2015.

BRICS payment system

At the 2015 BRICS summit in Russia, ministers from BRICS nations, initiated consultations for a payment system that would be an alternative to the Society for Worldwide Interbank Financial Telecommunication (SWIFT) system. Russian Deputy Foreign Minister Sergey Ryabkov stated in an interview, "The finance ministers and executives of the BRICS central banks are negotiating ... setting up payment systems and moving on to settlements in national currencies. SWIFT or not, in any case we’re talking about ... a global multilateral payment system that would provide greater independence, would create a definite guarantee for BRICS."

The Central Bank of Russia (CBR) also started consultations with BRICS nations for a payment system that would be an alternative to the SWIFT system. The main benefits highlighted were backup and redundancy in case there were disruptions to the SWIFT system. The Deputy Governor of the Central Bank of Russia, Olga Skorobogatova, stated in an interview, "The only topic that may be of interest to all of us within BRICS is to consider and talk over the possibility of setting up a system that would apply to the BRICS countries, used as a backup."

China has also initiated the development of their own SWIFT-alternative payment-system called the Cross-Border Inter-Bank Payments System (CIPS), which would provide a network that enables financial institutions worldwide to send and receive information about financial transactions in a secure, standardized, and reliable environment. India also has its alternative Structured Financial Messaging System (SFMS), as does Russia with its Система передачи финансовых сообщений (СПФС)/System for Transfer of Financial Messages (SPFS).

Reception

In 2012, Hu Jintao, the then General Secretary of the Chinese Communist Party and President of China, described the BRICS countries as defenders and promoters of developing countries and a force for world peace. Western analysts have highlighted potential divisions and weaknesses in the grouping, including significant economic instabilities, disagreements among the members over the UN Security Council reform, and India and China's disputes over territorial issues.

On 9 April 2013, Isobel Coleman from the Council on Foreign Relations, director of CFR's Civil Society, Markets, and Democracy Program said that members of BRICS share a lack of consensus. They uphold drastically different political systems, from a vibrant democracy in Brazil to entrenched oligarchy in Russia, and their economies are little integrated and are different in size by orders of magnitude. Also, she states that the significant difference in GDP influences the reserves. China taking up over 41% of the contribution, which in turn leads to bigger political say within the association.

Vijay Prashad, author and the Edward Said Chair at the American University of Beirut, 2014 raised the BRICS limitations as a political and economic "locomotive of the South" because they follow neoliberal policies. They have established neither new counter-balancing institutions nor come up with an alternative ideology. Furthermore, the BRICS project, argues Prashad, has no ability to challenge the primacy of the United States and NATO.

BRICS Pro Tempore Presidency
The group at each summit elects one of the heads of state of the component countries to serve as President Pro Tempore of the BRICS. In 2019, the pro tempore presidency was held by the president of Brazil.

The theme of the 11th BRICS summit was "BRICS:economic growth for an innovative future", and

the priorities of the Brazilian Pro Tempore Presidency for 2019 are the following -Strengthening of the cooperation in Science, technology and innovation; Enhancement of the cooperation on digital economy; Invigoration of the cooperation on the fight against transnational crime, especially against organized crime, money laundering and drug trafficking; Encouragement to the rapprochement between the New Development Bank (NDB) and the BRICS Business Council. Currently the new President Pro Tempore is Russia and their goals are: investing into BRICS countries in order to strengthen everyone's economies, cooperating in the energy and environmental industries, helping with young children and coming up with resolutions on migration and peacekeeping.

Current leaders

Current ministerial leaders

See also
 Emerging and growth-leading economies
 Emerging power
 List of BRICS summit attendees
 List of country groupings
 List of multilateral free-trade agreements
 Potential superpowers
 Shanghai Cooperation Organisation 
 BRICS Games
 MIKTA

Notes

References

Sources 

 "Eighth Annual BRICS Summit in Goa: (Narendra Modi, Vladimir Putin, Michel Temer, and Xi Jinping)", Dainik Bhaskar, 15 October 2016.

Further reading
 Carmody, Pádraig (2013). The Rise of BRICS in Africa: The Geopolitics of South-South Relations.  Zed Books. . 
 Chun, Kwang (2013). The BRICs Superpower Challenge: Foreign and Security Policy Analysis.  Ashgate Pub Co. .

External links

 

 
Economic country classifications
Foreign relations of Brazil
Foreign relations of Russia
Foreign relations of India
Foreign relations of China
Foreign relations of South Africa
Multilateral relations of China
Multilateral relations of Russia
Organizations established in 2009